J. Fred Manning (September 17, 1875 – December 6, 1955) was a Massachusetts politician who served as the 39th Mayor of Lynn, Massachusetts. The Manning Bowl, Lynn's football stadium from 1938 to 2004 was named for Manning.  Manning Field, Lynn's current football stadium was named for Manning.

Notes

Mayors of Lynn, Massachusetts
Commissioners of Essex County, Massachusetts
1875 births
1955 deaths